Uniporus is a genus of worms belonging to the monotypic family Uniporidae.

The species of this genus are found in Subarctic regions.

Species:

Uniporus acutocaudatus 
Uniporus alisae 
Uniporus borealis 
Uniporus hyalinus

References

Polystilifera
Nemertea genera